This page shows the results of the Racquetball Competition for men and women at the 1995 Pan American Games, held from March 11 to March 26, 1995 in Mar del Plata, Argentina. Racquetball made its debut at this edition of the Pan Am Games.

Men's competition

Singles

Doubles

Teams

Women's competition

Singles

Doubles

Teams

Medal table

References

 Sports 123
 Racquetball Magazine Volume 6, Number 3 May-June 1995, Pages 8-15

Events at the 1995 Pan American Games
1995 in racquetball
1995
Racquetball in Argentina